SJB may refer to:
 Hochkirchliche St.-Johannes-Bruderschaft, a German High Church Lutheran religious society
 Sajau Basap language's ISO code
 San Joaquín Airport's IATA code

In schools:
St. Jean de Brebeuf Catholic High School, Woodbridge, Ontario, Canada
St. Jean de Brebeuf Secondary School, Hamilton, Ontario, Canada
St John the Baptist School, Woking, Surrey, England, United Kingdom
St. John The Baptist School (Alden, New York), United States
St. John the Baptist Diocesan High School, West Islip, New York, United States
St John Bosco Arts College, Liverpool, England

Automotive:
 Smart Junction Box, a junction box, usually with microcontroller, for addition functions

Other:
Samagi Jana Balawegaya, Sri Lankan political party

See also
 Saint-Jean-Baptiste Society or SSJB